Wendy Matthews is a Canadian-born Australian adult contemporary singer and songwriter. Her discography consists of nine studio albums, two live albums, two compilation albums, four video albums and twenty-four singles.

Matthews started recording as a session and jingles singer in Los Angeles in 1981, one of her early vocals was for "Willow Pattern" which appeared on Osamu Kitajima's album Dragon King in 1982. Further session work was followed by touring Australia with Glenn Shorrock (ex-Little River Band) into 1983. Matthews relocated to Sydney and continued her session work and joined bands including Models in 1985, Rockmelons in 1988 and Absent Friends in 1989. Matthews also supplied vocals for Australian Broadcasting Corporation (ABC) TV series, Dancing Daze (1986), she supplied lead vocals on four tracks for the related soundtrack, Dancing Daze – Rock and three singles, "Dancing Daze" (duet with Jenny Morris), "Dare to Be Bold" and "Might Have Been" (trio with Morris and Mark Williams). A second ABC TV series was Stringer (1987), where Matthews and Kate Ceberano released a duet album, You've Always Got the Blues – Songs from the ABC TV Series "Stringer" in 1988. The album peaked in the Top 10 on the Australian Kent Music Report Albums Chart.

Matthews released her debut solo studio album Émigré in 1990, which peaked at No. 11 on the ARIA Albums Chart.

Albums

Studio albums

As featured artist albums

Live albums

Soundtracks

Compilation albums

Video albums

Singles

Other appearances

See also

References

General
 
 Note: Archived on-line copy has limited functionality.
 
 
 
 
Specific

Discography
Pop music discographies
Discographies of Australian artists